Durham Crown Court is a Crown Court venue which deals with criminal cases at Old Elvet, Durham, England. Located immediately to the north of Durham Prison, it is a Grade II* listed building.

History
The original venue for the assize courts in Durham was the old Shire Hall (also known as the County House) beside Palace Green; this "inconvenient building" had been established by Bishop John Cosin in the 1660s. In the early 19th century, it was decided to commission a more substantial courthouse; the site chosen, on the west side of Old Elvet, had been granted by Bishop William de St-Calais to the Prior and Convent of Durham in the late 11th century.

The building was designed by George Moneypenny and Ignatius Bonomi in the neoclassical style, built in ashlar stone and was officially opened on 14 August 1811. The design involved a symmetrical main frontage of seven bays facing north onto Court Lane. The central section of three bays, which was projected forward, featured a tetrastyle portico formed by Tuscan order columns supporting a pediment. There central section contained three double-doors on the ground floor and three sash windows, which were protected by wrought iron guardrails, on the first floor. The outer bays were also fenestrated by sash windows and the end bays were also slightly projected forward. Internally, the building was laid out to accommodate four courtrooms. 

A large prison was opened, just behind the courthouse, in 1819. The interior was extensively refurbished to a design by the borough architect, William Crozier, in 1870.

Notable cases included the trial and conviction of Mary Ann Cotton, in March 1873, for murdering her two sons, her stepson and her husband.

Following the implementation of the Courts Act 1971, the former assizes courthouse was re-designated Durham Crown Court.

See also
 Grade II* listed buildings in County Durham

References

External links
 Court information

Crown Court buildings
Government buildings completed in 1811
Buildings and structures in Durham, England
Grade II* listed buildings in County Durham
Court buildings in England